Zethus carpenteri is a potter wasp in the family Vespidae, subfamily Eumeninae native to Venezuela.

References

Potter wasps
Hymenoptera of South America
Insects described in 1997